Steimbke is a Samtgemeinde ("collective municipality") in the district of Nienburg, in Lower Saxony, Germany. Its seat is in the village Steimbke.

The Samtgemeinde Steimbke consists of the following municipalities:
 Linsburg
 Rodewald
 Steimbke
 Stöckse

Samtgemeinden in Lower Saxony